Paolo Spinola or Pablo Spínola Doria (24 February 1628 – 24 December 1699), 3rd Marquis of the Balbases and 3rd Duke of San Severino and Sesto, was a Spanish nobleman of Italian descent and a diplomat.

Biography

Spinola was born in 1628, the son of Filippo Spinola, 2nd Marquis of Los Balbases and Geronima Doria. His grandfather was the Italian-Spanish general and banker Ambrogio Spinola.

Paolo was Governor of the Duchy of Milan during 1668 and 1670 after which he was replaced by Gaspar Téllez-Girón, 5th Duke de Osuna.

He was Spanish ambassador to Vienna between 1670 and 1676 and then to Paris in 1677.

Family

In 1653, he married Anna Colonna (daughter of Marcantonio V Colonna, Prince of Paliano) in Rome. Their children were:

 Isabella Spinola (died 1700) - married Francesco Maria Spinola, 3rd Duke of San Pietro in Galatina.
 Teresa Antonia Spinola (born 23 October 1659) - married Martín Domingo de Guzmán, 4th Marquis of Montealegre.
 Felipe Antonio Spinola, 4th Marquis of the Balbases (1665–1721) - Viceroy of Sicily who married Isabel Maria de la Cerda (1667–1708), daughter of Juan Francisco de la Cerda, Duke of Medinaceli.
 Luisa Spinola - married Gregorio Januario de Bracamonte y Bracamonte.
 Antonia Spínola (died 1744) - married Marino Francesco Caracciolo (1688–1727), 6th Prince of Avellino.

References

1628 births
1699 deaths
Spanish generals
17th-century Spanish nobility
Marquesses of the Balbases
17th-century Italian nobility
Governors of the Duchy of Milan
Spanish people of Italian descent
Grandees of Spain